Schnarrenberg may refer to:

 Schnarrenberg (Tübingen), a mountain of Baden-Württemberg, Germany
 Schnarrenberg (Stuttgart), a mountain of Baden-Württemberg, Germany